The Forceville family were a family of organ builders from the Southern Netherlands based in Antwerp.

Joannes Baptista Forceville (1655–1739), sometimes called "father of the Flemish Rococo organ" was born in Saint-Omer, where he was apprenticed to his fellow townsman Francois van Isacker (Veurne, 1633 – Saint-Omer, 1682), he then worked as a travelling organ builder before settling in Antwerp, where he later entered the Guild of Saint Luke. In about 1705 he moved to Brussels where he was appointed organ master at the Court and was charged with the construction of a monumental organ in the Cathedral of St. Michael and St. Gudula. 

After his death in 1739, they continued to follow in his footsteps. Jean-Baptiste Forceville is also considered the organ builder who best synthesizes the French and Flemish styles. He imbued the Brussels style with French influence. The Franco-Flemish style introduced into organ building in Belgium by Forceville persisted there until the end of the 19th century.

Johannes Thomas Forceville (1696–1750) was born in Antwerp, where his father had moved from Saint-Omer. He was the son of Jean-Baptiste Forceville and his first wife Magdalena Cannaert. He was trained by his father and, after working with him, by 1734 was working autonomously. In 1734 he restored the organ of the Church of Our Lady of Laeken in association with Egide Le Blas.

See also
List of pipe organ builders

Further reading
 J. Robijns & Miep Zijlstra, Algemene Muziek Encyclopedie deel 3, Unieboek 1980, pagina 252/253 met tekst uit De orgelmakers Forceville van G.Potvlieghe, 1962; 
 G. Potvlieghe, Joannes-Baptista Forceville (1655–1739) – vader van het Vlaamse rococo-orgel, in Orgelkunst, nr. 157, jg. 40, juni 2017, p. 80–97
 G. Potvlieghe, De orgelmakers Forceville, in De Brabantse Folklore, 1962, nr. 152, pp. 318–361
 G. Potvlieghe, Hoge barok met J.B. Forceville, in: F. Peeters & M.A. Vente, De orgelkunst in de Nederlanden van de 16de tot de 18de eeuw, Gaade/Amerongen, 1984, pp. 218–222
 A. Fauconnier, J.B. Forceville, vader van het Vlaamse Rococo-orgel, in Vlaanderen, nr. 129, jg. 21, november-december 1972, pp. 330–332

References

Flemish pipe organ builders
Belgian musical instrument makers